Frida Tegstedt (born 17 July 1987) is a Swedish female handballer who plays as a pivot for Issy-Paris Hand and the Swedish national team.

Achievements
Swedish Championship: 
Gold Medalist: 2007, 2009, 2010, 2011, 2012, 2013, 2014
Carpathian Trophy: 
Winner: 2015

References

1987 births
Living people
Handball players from Gothenburg
Swedish female handball players
Expatriate handball players
Swedish expatriate sportspeople in France
Swedish expatriate sportspeople in Germany
Handball players at the 2016 Summer Olympics
Olympic handball players of Sweden
IK Sävehof players
Füchse Berlin Reinickendorf HBC players